The African Patriots of Senegal for Work, Ethics and Fraternity (PASTEF), or just Patriots of Senegal, is a Senegalese political party founded in 2014 by Ousmane Sonko.

History

In a desire for political renewal, several young civil servants from the Senegalese public administration and from other backgrounds, united in a committee to create PASTEF in January 2014.

The party is defined above all as being a dynamic. Composed mainly of beginners in politics, nevertheless the personalities who make up the committee are qualified in trade union acts and public functions. Like taxation through its president.

In 2017, PASTEF joined the People's Alternative coalition for the legislative elections of that same year. This coalition is made up of several parties including: PASTEF, RND, MRDS, and others. During the final results, with 1.13% of the votes Ousmane Sonko - at the head of this coalition is elected deputy of the department of Dakar.

Two years after the first participation in the elections, the party is embarking on the presidential campaign, in which the President of the Republic of Senegal Macky Sall is a candidate for his own succession. In a country where people under 20 represent 55% of the population. The young age of Ousmane Sonko compared to the other candidates and his virulent declarations resonate among young people. Thus achieving a very good result with 15.67% of the votes and a third place for his first participation. Outgoing President Macky Sall was re-elected in the first round with 58.26%.

In September 2021 Ousmane Sonko formalized the creation of a new opposition alliance, Liberate the People, that included other political formations such as the Party for Unity and Rally and Manko Taxawu Sénégal. During the following year the coalition contested first the 2022 local elections, winning in several major cities including Dakar, and later the 2022 national election, gaining 56 seats and becoming the second biggest coalition in the National Assembly.

Electoral results

Presidential elections

National Assembly elections

References 

Political parties established in 2014
2014 establishments in Senegal
Socialist parties in Senegal
Pan-Africanist political parties in Africa